Low House is a historic home located near Whitsett, Guilford County, North Carolina. It dates to the 1820s, and is a two-story, five bay Federal style brick dwelling.  It has a gable roof, stone foundation, and one-story rear wing.  The house was renovated in 1968–1969.

It was listed on the National Register of Historic Places in 1978.

References

Houses on the National Register of Historic Places in North Carolina
Federal architecture in North Carolina
Houses in Guilford County, North Carolina
National Register of Historic Places in Guilford County, North Carolina